Active Directory naming context (NC) or directory partition, is a logical portion of the Microsoft's Active Directory (AD).

Description of the naming context 

Active Directory can support tens of millions of objects. To scale up those objects, the Active Directory database is divided up into partitions for replication and administration. Each logical partition replicates its changes separately among domain controllers in the forest.

Some directory partitions store forest wide configuration information and schema information; other directory partitions store information specific to individual domains, such as users, groups, and organizational units.

Default naming contexts 

By default, the Active Directory Domain Service contains the following naming contexts:
 Schema NC: stores schema information that is replicated to domain controllers in all domains of the forest.
 Configuration NC: stores topology and other configuration data information that is replicated to domain controllers in all domains of the forest.
 Domain NC: store domain information such as users and computers that is replicated to domain controllers in that domain only.

References

 Active Directory naming contexts (directory partitions)

Active Directory
Microsoft server technology